James Lockhart Webster (December 31, 1885 – August 8, 1948) was a Canadian politician. He served in the Legislative Assembly of British Columbia from 1946 to 1948  from the electoral district of Rossland-Trail, a member of the Coalition government. He died in office in 1948 from lung cancer.

References

1885 births
1948 deaths